is a railway station on the Hisatsu Line in Kirishima, Kagoshima, Japan, operated by Kyushu Railway Company (JR Kyushu). The station opened in 1958.

Lines
Hyōkiyama Station is served by the Hisatsu Line.

Adjacent stations

Surrounding area
Kagoshima Prefectural Road Route 477
Myōken Onsen
Amori River
Shinkawa Electric Power Station

See also
 List of railway stations in Japan

References

External links

  

Railway stations in Japan opened in 1958
Railway stations in Kagoshima Prefecture